Steven Avery (born 1962) is an American convicted of murder.

Steven, Stephen, or Steve Avery may also refer to:
 Steve Avery (American football) (born 1966), American football running back
 Steve Avery (baseball) (born 1970), American baseball pitcher